Cloverport Independent Schools is a school district serving Cloverport, Kentucky and surrounding areas of far western Breckinridge County.  The superintendent is Keith Haynes.  This district is one of the few remaining Independent districts in Kentucky that has not consolidated.  The school sports teams are called "Aces"

Schools

Elementary schools
William H. Natcher Elementary School (Grades PK-5)

Middle schools
Frederick Fraize Middle School (Grades 6–8)

High schools
Cloverport High School (Grades 9–12)

External links
Cloverport Independent Schools

Breckinridge County
School districts in Kentucky